7648 Tomboles, provisional designation , is a background asteroid from the inner regions of the asteroid belt, approximately  in diameter. It was discovered on 8 October 1989, by Japanese astronomers Yoshikane Mizuno and Toshimasa Furuta at the Kani Observatory in Kani, Japan. The asteroid was named after Scottish amateur astronomer Tom Boles.

Orbit and classification 

Tomboles is a non-family asteroid from the main belt's background population. It orbits the Sun in the inner main-belt at a distance of 1.9–2.4 AU once every 3 years and 2 months (1,157 days; semi-major axis of 2.16 AU). Its orbit has an eccentricity of 0.11 and an inclination of 3° with respect to the ecliptic.

Physical characteristics 

Tomboles has an absolute magnitude of 14.3. While its spectral type is unknown, it is likely a stony S-type asteroid based on the albedo (see below) derived from observations with the Wide-field Infrared Survey Explorer (WISE). As of 2018, no rotational lightcurve of this asteroid has been obtained from photometric observations. The body's rotation period, pole and shape remain unknown.

Diameter and albedo 

According to the survey carried out by the NEOWISE mission of NASA's WISE telescope, Tomboles measures 3.91 kilometers in diameter and its surface has an albedo of 0.20.

Naming 

This minor planet was named after Scottish amateur astronomer Tom Boles (born 1944) a discoverer of a minor planet (also see 84417 Ritabo) and a record-number of supernovae, using a robotic telescope at Coddenham Observatory  in Coddenham, Suffolk, in eastern England. Boles has been the President of the British Astronomical Association from 2003 to 2005.

The official naming citation was published by the Minor Planet Center on 13 November 2008.

References

External links 
 Asteroid Lightcurve Database (LCDB), query form (info )
 Dictionary of Minor Planet Names, Google books
 Asteroids and comets rotation curves, CdR – Observatoire de Genève, Raoul Behrend
 Discovery Circumstances: Numbered Minor Planets (5001)-(10000) – Minor Planet Center
 
 

007648
Discoveries by Toshimasa Furuta
Discoveries by Yoshikane Mizuno
Named minor planets
19891008